Malin Wollin, (born 8 December 1978) is a Swedish journalist, writer and blogger. She writes chronicles for Aftonbladet and for the magazine Mama. She also has the blog "Fotbollsfrun" (en:"Footballers wife"), at Aftonbladets website. In 2008, she was nominated as "Chronicle writer of the Year" for a gala to be held at Cirkus in Stockholm. She is in a relationship with former footballer Joachim Lantz who has played for Kalmar FF, Mjällby AIF and Östers IF. The couple has four children together and resides in Kalmar.

Bibliography
Ser min röv lång ut i den här? (2007)
Fotbollsfrun (2008)
Malin från Skaftnäs (2011)

References

External links 

Living people
1978 births
Swedish women writers